Rolling Ridge Farm is a historic home and farm complex located at Cazenovia in Madison County, New York.  The farmhouse was built about 1837 and is a two-story, rectangular, brick residence with a gable roof and in the Federal style.  Also on the property are two frame barns and a carriage house converted to gallery space.

It was added to the National Register of Historic Places in 1987.

References

Houses on the National Register of Historic Places in New York (state)
Federal architecture in New York (state)
Houses completed in 1837
Houses in Madison County, New York
National Register of Historic Places in Cazenovia, New York